The following is a list of articles on municipal elections for Toronto City Council in the city of Toronto, Ontario, Canada.

For many years, municipal elections occurred annually in Toronto. After 1956, elections occurred every other year until 1966 after which elections occurred in 1969 and 1972 before reverting to a 2-year cycle. After 1982, elections again occurred every third year and, after the 2006 election the term of city council grew to 4 years.

Toronto's mayor was elected at-large through First past the post.

The four member Toronto Board of Control was introduced with the 1904 election and was accompanied by a reduction in the number of alderman elected per ward from four to three. The Board of Control was abolished with the 1969 municipal election.

Toronto had 39 aldermen (3 elected in each of 13 wards) in 1890 and 1891. In 1892 the number of aldermen was dropped to 24 (4 elected in each of six wards). This number was further reduced in 1910, to 20 elected in 7 wards, then in 1919 it was raised to 24 elected in 8 wards.

All elections of multiple members was by Block Voting, with this exception - in 1903 Toronto adopted Cumulative voting for election of members of the Board of Control and the Board of Education.

For most of the first half of the twentieth century elections were held on or around New Year's Day. Voting day was on the first Monday of December from 1950 until 1978 when it moved to the second Monday in November. Beginning in 2010, election day is on the fourth Monday of October.

Popular Elections for Council and Appointment of Mayor (1834-1858)

Popular Elections for Mayor and Council (1859-1866)

Popular Elections for Council and Appointment of Mayor (1867-1873)

Popular Elections for Mayor and Council (since 1874)

References
The Globe (1844-1936), ProQuest Historical Newspapers: The Globe and Mail

Notes

Elections, Municipal